Sports 2000 is a restricted-rules class of two-seat, mid-engined, open-cockpit, full-bodied sports-prototype racecar used largely in amateur road racing. Sometimes known as S2000 or S2, the class was developed by John Webb, then of the Brands Hatch racing circuit in England, as an affordable form of sports car racing, essentially a sports car version of Formula Ford 2000. The key attributes of the class were a body design reminiscent of two-liter Group 6 sports racing cars like the Chevron B21 and Lola T-212 but with an ultra-reliable and inexpensive drivetrain comprising a two-liter "Pinto" overhead camshaft engine with very limited allowed modifications and the well-proven, VW-based Hewland Mk 9 transaxle. S2000 aerodynamics continued to evolve beyond their 1970s Group 6 roots, with very 'slippery' cars featuring spats over the wheels becoming the norm.

In the UK S2000 was largely seen as an alternative to front-engined Clubmans racing, a class for amateurs who were often deeply involved in developing their own cars over periods of years.

In the US, while it continues to have popularity as an amateur race class within SCCA competition in the US, at one point in the late 1980s and early 1990s, professional Sports 2000 racing was prevalent. One such series was the American Cities Racing League (ACRL) where the teams represented cities (primarily on the US West Coast) much as in stick-and-ball sports. Rather than individual drivers running for the championship, the two team drivers earned points for their sponsor city, a concept revived for the A1GP, where teams represent countries rather than cities. This series used the uprated Cosworth/Ford YAC engine. Another series was the North American Pro Series or NAPS which visited many of the classic roadrace circuits in the U.S. and was often a support race for IMSA weekends. Later this series became the Oldsmobile Pro Series running the Oldsmobile Quad 4 engine.

In Sports 2000 racing in the UK, the Pinto engine has recently been replaced with the Mazda-based Ford Duratec engine, although Pintos continue to compete as a separate class.

In South Africa, an innovative transverse engined version of the Sports 2000 participated in a highly successful national series throughout the 1990s. Notable drivers (and series organizers) are Neville Jordan and Alan Eve who now own the A1GP cars and have set up Afrix Motorsport.

Early Sports 2000 cars are now of a sufficient age that they are being welcomed by several vintage racing sanctioning bodies in the US.

Companies that manufactured Sports 2000 chassis include: Carbir, Chevron, Crossle, Lola, March, MCR, Reynard, Rotor, Royale, Shannon, Swift, Tiga Race Cars and Van Diemen.

External links

Sports 2000 Racing Championship 

Sports car racing series
Sports prototypes
Racing car classes